Miloš Vranjanin (born 11 June 1996) is a Serbian football defender who plays for Hungarian club Kisvárda.

Career
He made his Serbian Super Liga debut with FK Metalac in August 2020.

On 27 June 2022, Vranjanin signed with Kisvárda in Hungary.

References

1996 births
Footballers from Belgrade
Living people
Serbian footballers
Association football defenders
FK Radnički Obrenovac players
FK Teleoptik players
FK Metalac Gornji Milanovac players
Riga FC players
Kisvárda FC players
Serbian First League players
Serbian SuperLiga players
Latvian Higher League players
Nemzeti Bajnokság I players
Serbian expatriate footballers
Expatriate footballers in Latvia
Serbian expatriate sportspeople in Latvia
Expatriate footballers in Hungary
Serbian expatriate sportspeople in Hungary